During the 1982–83 English football season, Queens Park Rangers competed in the Second Division and finished as champions, winning promotion back to the First Division after an absence of four years.

Season summary
Rangers showed consistent form throughout the season and were never out of the top three from October onwards. After going top with a 4–0 win over Rotherham United on 19 March, they pulled away from the chasing pack to finish ten points clear of 2nd-placed Wolverhampton Wanderers. Promotion was clinched by a 1–0 win over Leeds United on 23 April, and the championship followed courtesy of a 3–1 win over Fulham on 2 May.

Squad
Substitute appearances indicated in brackets

Second Division

Results

Second Division

Milk Cup

FA Cup

References

Bibliography
 

Queens Park Rangers F.C. seasons
Queens Park Rangers